The 1952 All-SEC football team consists of American football players selected to the All-Southeastern Conference (SEC) chosen by various selectors for the 1952 college football season. Georgia Tech won the conference.

Offensive selections

Ends
Steve Meilinger, Kentucky (College Football Hall of Fame)  (AP, UP-1)
Harry Babcock, Georgia (AP, UP-2)
Buck Martin, Georgia Tech (UP-1)
Ben Roderick, Vanderbilt (UP-2)
James Mack, Ole Miss (UP-3)
Roger Rotroff, Tennessee (UP-3)

Tackles
Hal Miller, Georgia Tech (AP, UP-2)
Kline Gilbert, Ole Miss (AP, UP-2)
Bill Turnbeaugh, Auburn (UP-3)
Paul Miller, LSU (UP-3)

Guards
John Michels, Tennessee (College Football Hall of Fame) (AP, UP-1)
Crawford Mims, Ole Miss (UP-2)
Orville Vernon, Georgia Tech (UP-2)
Jerry Watford, Alabama (AP, UP-3)
Ed Gessage, Georgia Tech (UP-3)

Centers
Pete Brown, Georgia Tech (AP, UP-2)

Quarterbacks
Jackie Parker, Miss. St. (College Football Hall of Fame) (AP, UP-1)
Jimmy Lear, Ole Miss (UP-2)
Bill Krietemeyer, Vanderbilt (UP-3)

Halfbacks
Leon Hardeman, Georgia Tech (AP, UP-1)
Bobby Marlow, Alabama (AP, UP-1)
Zeke Bratkowski, Georgia (UP-2)
Joe Fortunato, Miss. St. (UP-2)
Corky Tharp, Alabama (UP-3)
Buford Long, Florida (UP-3)

Fullbacks
Andy Kozar, Tennessee (AP, UP-1)
Rick Casares, Florida (UP-2)
Max McGee, Tulane (UP-3)

Defensive selections

Ends
Sam Hensley, Georgia Tech (AP)
Mack Franklin, Tennessee (AP)

Tackles
Charlie LaPradd, Florida (AP, UP-1 [as T])
Doug Atkins, Tennessee (AP, UP-1 [as T])

Guards
Joe D'Agostino, Florida (AP, UP-1 [as G])
Francis Holohan, Tennessee (AP)

Linebackers
George Morris, Georgia Tech (AP, UP-1 [as C])
Larry Morris, Georgia Tech (UP-3)

Backs
Cecil Ingram, Alabama (AP)
Bobby Moorhead, Georgia Tech (AP)
Art Decarlo, Georgia (AP)

Key

AP = Associated Press The AP selection had two platoons, but not UP's.

UP = United Press.

Bold = Consensus first-team selection by both AP and UP

See also
1952 College Football All-America Team

References

All-SEC
All-SEC football teams